
Shadow Lord or Shadowlord may refer to:

Politics 
 Shadow Lord Chancellor, a member of the British Shadow Cabinet

Literature 
 Shadow Lord (novel), a Star Trek novel
 The Shadow Lord, a villain from the Deltora Quest series

Toys 
 Shadowlord (board game), a board game published by Parker Brothers in 1983

Video games 
 The Shadowlord, an antagonist in the video game Nier
 The Shadow Lord, an antagonist in the video game Final Fantasy XI
 The Shadowlords, characters in Ultima V: Warriors of Destiny